This is a list of people from Exeter, a city in south-west England. People from Exeter are known as Exonians. This list is arranged chronologically by date of birth.

Born before 1701
Baldwin of Exeter (died 1190), Archbishop of Canterbury
Joseph of Exeter (12th century), poet
Robert Stone (1516–1613), composer and member of the Chapel Royal
John Hooker (1525–1601), constitutionalist
William Peryam (1534 – after 1603), lawyer
Sir Thomas Bodley (1545–1613), diplomat and founder of the Bodleian Library
Nicholas Hilliard (c. 1547–1619), portraitist
John Rainolds (1549–1605), Puritan scholar
Richard Hooker (1554–1600), Anglican theologian
William Hakewill (1574–1655), legal antiquarian
George Hakewill (1578–1649), clergyman and author
Matthew Locke (c. 1621–1677), Baroque composer
Henrietta Anne Stuart (1644–1670), daughter of King Charles I
Peter King, 1st Baron King (1669–1734), Lord Chancellor
Thomas Yalden (1670–1736), poet
Simon Ockley (1678–1720), orientalist
Eustace Budgell (1686–1737), writer
Andrew Brice (1690–1773), printer and writer

Born 1701–1850
Thomas Hudson (1701–1779), portrait painter
Francis Hayman (1708–1776), Rococo artist
John Rowe (1715–1787), merchant and owner of ship involved in Boston Tea Party
Thomas Mudge (horologist) (1715-1794), horologist who was responsible for the Lever escapement mechanism
Samuel Stennett (1727–1795), Baptist minister and hymnwriter
Richard Langdon (1729–1803), organist and composer
William Jackson (1730–1803), referred to as Jackson of Exeter, was an organist and composer
Robert Trewman (1738/39–1802), first proprietor of Trewman's Exeter Flying Post, published 1763–1917
Sir Francis Baring, 1st Baronet (1740–1810), banker
Richard Eastcott (baptised 1744–1828), Anglican clergyman and writer on music
Robert Hawker (1753–1827), Anglican clergyman
David Collins (1756–1810), first governor of Van Diemens Land (Tasmania)
John Stockham (1765–1814), naval officer
Richard Parker (1767–1797), sailor and mutineer
John Blackall (1771–1860), physician
George Oliver (1781–1861), Catholic churchman and historian
James Holman (1786–1857), noted blind traveller
Sir John Bowring (1792–1872), political economist and Governor of Hong Kong
Thomas Shapter (1809–1902), doctor and author of History of the Cholera in Exeter in 1832
Samuel Cousins (1801–1887), engraver
Mary Carpenter (1807–1877), educational and social reformer
William Benjamin Carpenter (1813–1885), physiologist and naturalist
John Carne Bidwill (1815–1853), botanist, first director of the Royal Botanic Gardens, Sydney
Lilly Martin Spencer (1822–1902), US painter
Lavington Glyde (1824-1890), South Australian politician and accountant
Henry Chadwick (1824–1908), journalist, "father of baseball"
Sabine Baring-Gould (1834–1924), writer, clergyman, antiquary and folklorist
Sir Harry James Veitch (1840–1924), horticulturist
William John Seward Webber (1842–1919), sculptor
William Kingdon Clifford (1845–1879), mathematician

Born 1851–1950
Eva Luckes (1854–1919), matron of The London Hospital 1880–1919, pioneer of training for nurses
Theodore Bayley Hardy (1863–1918), Army chaplain and VC
Fred Karno (1866–1941), comedy pioneer and impresario
Irene Vanbrugh (1872–1949), actress
Herbert Augustine Carter (1874–1916), army officer and VC
William Temple (1881–1944), Archbishop of Canterbury
Gordon Steele (1891–1981), recipient of the Victoria Cross
Primrose Pitman (1902–1998), artist
W. G. Hoskins (1908–1992), historian of the English landscape
Cliff Bastin (1912–1991), Arsenal and England footballer
John Manners (1914–2020), English cricketer and Royal Navy officer; oldest living first-class cricketer
Tommy Cooper (1921–1984), comedian born in Caerphilly but living in Exeter from the age of three
Denis Pereira Gray (born 1935), physician
Tony Burrows (born 1942), pop singer
Sarah Harrison (born 1946), novelist
Peter Rutley (born 1946), former professional footballer
Doug Finley (1946–2013), Canadian Senator and principal operational strategist of the Conservative Party of Canada

Born since 1950
Clare Morrall (born 1952), novelist
John Scott (born 1954), England rugby union international
Beth Gibbons (born 1965), singer with Portishead
Ben Nealon (born 1966), actor
Toby Buckland (born 1969), gardener, TV presenter and author
Michael Caines (born 1969), chef and restaurateur
Jane Griffiths (born 1970), poet and literary historian
Chris Martin (born 1977), lead singer of Coldplay
Mathew Theedom (born 1977), cricketer
Dominic Wood (born 1978), TV presenter
Matthew Goode (born 1978), actor
David Lye (born 1979), cricketer
Scott C Shephard (born 1979), music executive
Jim Causley (born 1980), folk singer
Stuart Hooper (born 1981), rugby union player
Rebecca Worthley (born 1981), singer/songwriter
Trevor Anning (born 1982), cricketer
Bradley James (born 1983), actor
Kate Bushell (born 1983), victim of a high-profile child murder in the city in 1997, her murder remains unsolved as of 2022
Tim Shaw (born 1984), American football player for Tennessee Titans
Ben Aldridge (born 1985), actor
Liam Tancock (born 1985), world champion swimmer
Aaron Jarvis (born 1986), Wales rugby union player
Liam Lewis (born 1986), cricketer
Kour Pour (born 1987), artist
James Yeoburn (born 1987), theatre producer and entrepreneur
Liam Sercombe (born 1990), professional footballer
Luke Newberry (born 1990), actor
Joe Launchbury (born 1991), England rugby union international
Harry Tincknell (born 1991), professional racing driver, 24 Hours of Le Mans LMP2-class winner
Tristan Evans (born 1994), drummer in The Vamps
Matt Grimes (born 1995), footballer for Swansea City A.F.C.
Xia Vigor (born 2009), actress for ABS CBN
Thomas Cameron (born 1999), classical singer, radio host

See also
List of people associated with the University of Exeter
List of Bishops of Exeter

References

Exeter
 
People